Babakuli Annakov (born 1972) is a chess Grandmaster.

Career 
Annakov began to participate in international tournaments after the collapse of the USSR . In 1992, he won a silver medal in the individual championship of Turkmenistan and took part in the world championship among juniors under 20 in Buenos Aires . In 1993, Annakov shared second place with Vitaly Golod , Alexey Bezgodov and Valery Yandemirov at a round-robin tournament in Ufa . In 1996, he shared 1st place in a tournament in Moscow, and in 1997 he won with Evgeny Vorobyovnext tournament in this city. These successes allowed Annakov to score 2,585 points and enter the first hundred of the FIDE world rankings (98th place in the world as of January 1, 1998). Already on July 1 of the same 1998, with 2600 points, he climbed to 78th place in the world.  In 2000, Annakov won the Foxwoods Open in Mashantucket, Connecticut , USA. Subsequently, he did not achieve significant international success, with the exception of 1st place at the World Open tournament in Philadelphia in 2003, which Annakov shared with Yaan Elvest , Ilya Smirin and Alexander Onishchuk .  The lack of significant success and the decline in tournament activity led to a gradual decrease in the chess player's rating. Since 2005 he has been living in the USA.

References 

Chess grandmasters
1988 births
Living people